Longgui Park is a park in Guangfu Village, Magong City, Penghu County, Taiwan.

In 2018, the Penghu County Government planned to spend NTD 25,820,000 to demolish the park for a new road, which triggered a protest by several of local residents.

History 
Longgui Park is located in Guangfu village, Magong City, next to an abandoned power plant. It was completed on July 20, 2001 and cost NTD 880,000. It was named after Deng Long-gui who contributed to the construction of the park. Longgui Park is one of few community parks in downtown Magong, and it is also a friendly shelter to feral cats.

Road Dispute

Background 
During the period of magistrate Wang Chien-fa's term (2005-2014), county council member Chen Hai-shan proposed to open a new road from Xincun Road to Haipu Road, running through Longgui Park and the nearby abandoned Taiwan Power Company power station.

In 2015, Ou Zhi-cheng, the Penghu power station plant manager, proposed preservation of the power station buildings. Chen Hai-shan rejected this, saying "There is not any reason to preserve Magong power station because I cannot tell any kind feature of it." He insisted on demolishing the plant and Longgui Park for construction of the new road.

Penghu County Government and Taiwan Power Company negotiated that the company would release the land on November 8, 2016.

In early October 2017, county executive Chen Kuang-fu promised that "The project of opening a road from Xincun Road to Haipu Road" must begin the next March.

However, by June 2018 the project had not started. County council member Chen Hai-shan asked Hsueh Hung-ying (the director of Penghu county government economic affairs department) to execute the project as soon as possible. "If county council could agree to afford the advance payment (NTD 25,820,000), we might start the construction in August." Hsueh replied. Chen Hai-shan promised Hsueh the advance payment would be approved in the session, but if it didn't, construction should still start. "We'll see about that!" Chen Hai-shan threatened.

Protests 
Local politician Sheng Yi-che and residents from Guangfu village staged a protest of the project on July 31, 2018. They held a press conference and declared their dissatisfaction to the Penghu County Government. "This project is very ridiculous and unacceptable! It is unnecessary to spend about 2,600 million dollars destroying a community park and an abandoned plant just for expand Xincun Road!" Said by Sheng Yi-che.

"It is nonsense! We won't execute this project on August 15" replied Lin Wen-zao, the vice manager of the county government economic affairs department.

On August 7, 2018, Penghu County Government announced Lu Chun-tian would replace Hsueh Hung-ying as the manager of Penghu county government economic affairs department.

References 

2001 establishments in Taiwan
Parks established in 2001
Parks in Taiwan
Penghu County